Nebo - Peklo - Raj (which translates to Heaven - Hell - Paradise) is the fourth studio album by the Slovak rock band Tublatanka released in 1990 by Supraphon Records. It contains the hit singles Matka and Démon Pomsty. This was also their first album to contain songwriting input from another member of the band, whereas previous three albums were composed solely by Ďurinda.

Track listing 
All lyrics by Martin Sarvaš except "Ilúzia" by Palo Horváth. Music as noted.

 "Démon pomsty" (Ďurinda)
 "Viem kam ísť" (Horváth)
 "Smrť a sláva" (Ďurinda)
 "Šlabikár IV" (Ďurinda)
 "Matka" (Ďurinda)
 "Nebezpečie života" (Ďurinda)
 "Dám ti viac" (Horváth)
 "Emigrantská pieseň" (Ďurinda)
 "Ilúzia" (Horváth)
 "Bol som dlho preč" (Horváth)
 "Nebo peklo raj" (Ďurinda)

Credits

Band 
Maťo Ďurinda - vocals (1, 4-6, 8, 11) lead, rhythm and acoustic guitar, piano
Palo Horváth - bass guitar, vocals (2, 3, 7, 9, 10)
Ďuro Černý - drums, percussion

Other 
Andy Hryc - spoken word (1)

Tublatanka albums
1990 albums